Carl Schlyter (born 7 January 1968 in Danderyd, Stockholm County) is a Swedish politician who has been a member of the Swedish Riksdag for Stockholm County since 2014. He was a Member of the European Parliament (MEP) from 2004 to 2014. He is a member of the Green Party, which is part of the European Greens, and sat on the European Parliament's Committee on the Environment, Public Health and Food Safety. He is a member of the ACP-EU Joint Parliamentary Assembly.

He was also a substitute for the Committee on Budgetary Control and the Committee on Fisheries, and a substitute for the delegation for relations with the countries of Southeast Asia and the Association of Southeast Asian Nations.

Leaving Miljöpartiet and starting up a new party called Partiet Vändpunkt 

On 16 January 2019, Schlyter announced that he would be leaving the Green Party due to his disagreements with the Social Democrats regarding the 2018-19 government formation. On 13 February, he stated that he would be forming a new political party, Partiet vändpunkt, together with fellow Green Party MPs Annika Lillemets and Valter Mult. The party intends to focus on tackling climate change and claims to be critical of neoliberalism

Career
 Chemical engineering specialising in biotechnology and the environment (Royal Institute of Technology, Stockholm, 1987–1994)
 Research study Impurities in coal (Miami University, Ohio, 1989)
 Museum guide (1994)
 Political secretary of the Green Party in Stockholm City Hall (1994–1995)
 Assistant, European Parliament (1996)
 Responsible for Agenda 21 and the environment, culture and sports administration Stockholm (1997)
 Adviser to the Green Group in the Committee on Budgetary Control (1997–2004)
 Member of the party's Executive (2000–2008)
 Sweden's representative in the European Green Federation (since 2001)
 Sweden's representative in the Global Greens (since 2002)

References

External links
 Official website
 European Parliament biography
 

1968 births
Living people
People from Danderyd Municipality
Members of the Riksdag from the Green Party
Green Party (Sweden) MEPs
MEPs for Sweden 2004–2009
MEPs for Sweden 2009–2014
Articles containing video clips